Pavel Vakulich (born 14 September 1996) is a Belarusian professional footballer who plays for Yuni Minsk.

References

External links 
 
 

1996 births
Living people
Belarusian footballers
Association football midfielders
FC Slutsk players
FC Smorgon players
FC Torpedo Minsk players
FC Baranovichi players
FC Oshmyany players
FC Uzda players